The white-backed stilt (Himantopus melanurus) is a locally abundant shorebird of South American wetlands and coastlines. It is found from northwest Brazil to southwest Peru and southcentral Argentina.

Taxonomy
It is sometimes treated as a subspecies of the common or black-winged stilt, using the trinomial name Himantopus himantopus melanurus. The AOS considers it a subspecies of the black-necked stilt, where it is considered parapatric and intergrading to some extent with its northern relative where their ranges meet, and would warrant inclusion with the black-necked stilt when this is separated specifically.

Distribution and habitat
The white-backed stilt is found in estuarine, lacustrine, salt pond and emergent wetland habitats; it is generally a lowland bird but is commonly seen in llanos habitat.

Food and feeding
The white-backed stilt forages by probing and gleaning primarily in mudflats and lakeshores, but also in very shallow waters near shores; it seeks out a range of aquatic invertebrates – mainly crustaceans and other arthropods, and mollusks – and small fish, tadpoles and very rarely plant seeds. Its mainstay food varies according to availability; inland birds usually feed mainly on aquatic insects and their larvae, while coastal populations mostly eat other aquatic invertebrates. For feeding areas they prefer coastal estuaries, salt ponds, lakeshores, alkali flats and even flooded fields. For roosting and resting needs, this bird selects alkali flats (even flooded ones), lake shores, and islands surrounded by shallow water.

Breeding
This stilt chooses mudflats, desiccated lacustrine verges, and levees for nest locations, as long as the soil is friable. The nests are typically sited within  of a feeding location, and the pairs defend an extensive perimeter around groups of nests, patrolling in cooperation with their neighbors. The nests are frequently established rather close to the water edge, so that their integrity is affected by rising water levels of ponds or tides. This is particularly a hazard in the case of managed salt ponds where water levels may be altered rapidly in the salt pond flooding process.

The clutch size generally is 3–5 eggs with an average of four. For 22–26 days both sexes take turns incubating the eggs. The young are so precocial that they are seen swimming within two hours after hatching and are also capable of rapid land velocity at that early time. In spite of this early development the young normally return to the nest for resting for one or two more days. They fledge after about one month but remain dependent on their parents for some more weeks. Birds begin to breed at 1–2 years of age.

References

Further reading
 

white-backed stilt
Birds of South America
white-backed stilt
white-backed stilt